American Pie 2 is a 2001 American sex comedy film directed by James B. Rogers and written by Adam Herz and David H. Steinberg from a story by Herz. A sequel to the 1999 comedy film American Pie, it is the second film in the American Pie series and stars Jason Biggs, Shannon Elizabeth, Alyson Hannigan, Chris Klein, Natasha Lyonne, Thomas Ian Nicholas, Tara Reid, Seann William Scott, Mena Suvari, Eddie Kaye Thomas, and Eugene Levy. The film follows the sexual exploits of five friends–Jim, Kevin, Stifler, Oz, and Finch–and their attempts to have the greatest summer party ever at a summer beach house in Michigan.

American Pie 2 was released in the United States on August 10, 2001, and grossed over $145 million in the US and $142 million overseas on a budget of $30 million, making it the highest-grossing film in the franchise at just under $288 million worldwide. The film was followed by American Wedding.

Plot
Home for the summer after college, Jim Levenstein, Kevin Myers, Chris "Oz" Ostreicher, and Paul Finch attend Steve Stifler's party until the police shut it down. Kevin is inspired by his brother to rent a Lake Michigan beach house and throw a massive party to close out the summer. 

The group obtains jobs painting houses in order to afford the rent. Jim receives a call from former love interest Nadia who informs him that she plans to visit him. To gain sexual experience, Jim seeks out his prom date, Michelle, who agrees to help him after he is mistaken for a mentally disabled trombone prodigy and makes a fool of himself in front of a band camp concert audience.

The group hosts a small party where Kevin and his ex-girlfriend Vicky awkwardly lie to one another regarding the number of sexual partners they have had at college. Oz attempts to have phone sex with his girlfriend Heather while she is studying abroad in Spain but they are interrupted by Stifler.

While painting a house, the group observes the two female occupants Stifler assumes are lesbians and he enters their home while they are away in order to find proof. Jim and Finch pursue him inside in an attempt to stop him when the women return home and find the trio inside. They tempt the boys with some quid pro quo sex acts. However, when Stifler exposes his genitals after the women request watching the boys give each other handjobs, Finch and Jim leave in disgust.

Jim visits Michelle again to obtain sexual tips and they are nearly caught by a camp director. Stifler brings the group pornography and Jim later accidentally mistakes super glue for lubricant and learns his penis will be "unusable" for a short period of time. Meanwhile, Finch has become involved in the art of Tantra and waits to use his new skills with Stifler's mom, who he mistakenly believes has arrived but is disappointed when he learns it is Stifler's younger brother.

Nadia unexpectedly arrives early, much to the dismay of Jim as his penis has not fully healed. He and Michelle pretend to be in a relationship. However, she realizes that she has fallen in love with him but stages a mock breakup the night of the party so that Jim is free to hook up with Nadia. As the party begins, Jim realizes that he loves Michelle. Jim interrupts her concert performance and they return to the party together. 

Meanwhile, Sherman is seduced by Nadia who is attracted to his geeky persona. Kevin is disappointed to learn Vicky has brought a date and storms off onto the beach. Oz is happy when Heather unexpectedly arrives early. Jim, Oz, and Finch speak to Kevin, who admits he is struggling to move on after high school; but they reassure and convince him to return to the party. The group returns, Kevin apologizes to Vicky, and they all enjoy an evening of partying together. The two "lesbians" arrive to the party and later have a threesome with Stifler.

The next day, the group prepares to leave when a car pulls up; Finch approaches and finds Stifler's mom inside. They drive off together and have sex again.

Cast

Production

Principal photography began on February 14 and wrapped on April 27, 2001. Two versions of the film were released: the theatrical version and the unrated version. For the theatrical version, the film was cut slightly with a total of 19 scenes being altered. As a result, American Pie 2 achieved an R rating from the Motion Picture Association of America due to "strong sexual content, crude humor, language and drinking."

Reception

Box office
During the opening weekend, American Pie 2 grossed $45.1 million from 3,063 theaters in the United States and Canada, ranking at number one at the box office above Rush Hour 2, a record for an R-rated comedy, surpassing Scary Movie. This record would be held until 2008 when it was surpassed by Sex and the City. Overall, it had the second-highest opening weekend for any R-rated film, behind Hannibal. For 14 years, the film would hold the record for having the highest August opening weekend for an R-rated film until Straight Outta Compton took it in 2015. It was the fourth consecutive Universal film of the year to reach $40 million in a single weekend, after The Mummy Returns, The Fast and the Furious and Jurassic Park III. For the first time in history, four consecutive films had approached the $45 million mark in their opening weekends, after the latter film, Rush Hour 2 and Planet of the Apes. American Pie 2 became the first film to top the box office for multiple weeks since Pearl Harbor. 

The film's theatrical run wrapped up on December 20, 2001, with a final domestic gross of $145,103,595 and $142,450,000 overseas, adding to a total worldwide gross of $287,553,595. It grossed $8.4 million in its opening weekend in Germany, a record for a comedy and for United International Pictures in the country, beating UIP's previous record set by Jurassic Park. In the UK, the film dethroned Moulin Rouge! to reach the number one spot, earning $8 million. It spent three weeks at the top of the box office before being displaced by The Others.

Critical response
On Rotten Tomatoes, the film has an approval rating of 52% based on 127 reviews. The website's consensus states: "Being a sequel, American Pie 2 doesn't retain the freshness of the original, nor is it as funny." On Metacritic, the film has a weighted average score of 43 out of 100 based on reviews from 28 critics, indicating "mixed or average reviews". Audiences surveyed by CinemaScore gave the film an average rating of "B+" on an A+ to F scale.

Roger Ebert gave the film 3 out of 4 stars. In At the Movies, Ebert and Richard Roeper both gave the film "two thumbs up", with Roeper stating that the film had "more laughs than the original".

Home media
American Pie 2 was released on VHS and DVD on January 15, 2002. The movie was released in two different versions: the theatrical version and the unrated version. They consist of widescreen and fullscreen versions and feature Dolby Digital and DTS audio tracks.

Soundtrack 
 Blink-182 – "Everytime I Look for You"
 Green Day – "Scumbag"
 Left Front Tire – "Bring You Down"
 American Hi-Fi – "Vertigo"
 Uncle Kracker – "(I'm Gonna) Split This Room in Half"
 3 Doors Down – "Be Like That" (American Pie Edit)
 Alien Ant Farm – "Good (For a Woman)"
 Angela Ammons – "Always Getting Over You"
 Jettingham – "Cheating"
 Flying Blind – "Smokescreen"
 Fenix*TX – "Phoebe Cates"
 The Exit – "Susan"
 Sum 41 – "Fat Lip"
 Lucia Cifarelli – "I Will"
 Oleander – "Halo"
 Witness – "Here's One for You" (only on some soundtrack versions)
The following songs were included in the movie but not featured on the soundtrack:
 The Afghan Whigs – "Something Hot" (Plays when Jim and Michelle walk along the beach before entering the lighthouse)
 Lit – "A Place in the Sun" (Heather arrives at the party)
 The Lemonheads – "Mrs. Robinson" (written and originally performed by Simon & Garfunkel) (Finch and Stifler's mom drive off)
 Oleander – "Bruise" (Heather sees Oz, Kevin says hello to Summer)
 Lit – "The Last Time Again" (First song that plays in the closing credits)
 Libra presents Taylor – "Anomaly (Calling Your Name)" (Jim sees the photo of Nadia before his dad walks in)
 American Hi-Fi – "Flavor of the Weak" (Stifler chases Finch out of his mom's room)
 Hoi Polloi – "On My Mind" (Sherman, seduces Jessica)
 Transmatic – "Blind Spot" (First Dog Years Scene)
 John Philip Sousa – "Gladiator March"
 Hoagy Carmichael & Stuart Gorrell – "Georgia on My Mind"
 Ali Dee – "In and Out" (Stifler sees the lesbians)
 Rafael Hernandez Marin – "El Cumbanchero"
 Michelle Branch – "Everywhere" (Plays during the montage of the guys having fun in their beach house)
 Weezer – "Hash Pipe" (Stifler breaks into the lesbians' house)
 Julius Wechter – "Spanish Flea"
 Alien Ant Farm – "Smooth Criminal" (Jim super-gluing himself to himself)
 Toilet Böys – "Another Day in the Life" (Beginning of the lake house party)
 The Offspring – "Want You Bad" (Montage of Michelle and Jim dating)
 Sum 41 – "In Too Deep" (Heather and Oz and Jim and Michelle dance with each other)
 New Found Glory – "Hit or Miss" (The guys return from the beach)
 Witness – "Here's One for You" (uncredited) (only on some soundtrack versions)
 Larry Marciano – "The Way It Used to Be"
 Third Eye Blind – "Semi-Charmed Life"
 Zed – "Renegade Fighter"

Year-end charts

Certifications

References

External links

 
 
 
 
 
 

2000s American films
2001 films
2001 comedy films
2000s teen sex comedy films
American Pie (film series)
American sequel films
American sex comedy films
2000s English-language films
Films directed by J. B. Rogers
Films set in Michigan
Films set in 2000
Films with screenplays by Adam Herz
Universal Pictures films